Xenotilapia is a genus of cichlids species endemic to Lake Tanganyika in east Africa.

The International Union for Conservation of Nature (IUCN) has assessed 16 Xenotilapia species; one of them is considered "Vulnerable" (Xenotilapia burtoni), the rest are of "Least Concern" or "Data Deficient".

Species
There are currently 18 recognized species in this genus:

 Xenotilapia bathyphila Poll, 1956
 Xenotilapia boulengeri (Poll, 1942)
 Xenotilapia burtoni Poll, 1951
 Xenotilapia caudofasciata Poll, 1951
 Xenotilapia flavipinnis Poll, 1985 (Yellow sand cichlid)
 Xenotilapia leptura (Boulenger, 1901)
 Xenotilapia longispinis Poll, 1951
 Xenotilapia melanogenys (Boulenger, 1898)
 Xenotilapia nasus De Vos, Risch & Thys van den Audenaerde, 1995
 Xenotilapia nigrolabiata Poll, 1951 
 Xenotilapia ochrogenys (Boulenger, 1914)
 Xenotilapia ornatipinnis Boulenger, 1901
 Xenotilapia papilio Büscher, 1990
 Xenotilapia rotundiventralis (T. Takahashi, Yanagisawa & Nakaya, 1997)
 Xenotilapia sima Boulenger, 1899
 Xenotilapia spiloptera Poll & D. J. Stewart, 1975
 Xenotilapia tenuidentata Poll, 1951

References

 
Ectodini
Cichlid fish of Africa
Cichlid genera
Taxa named by George Albert Boulenger